Dharinnahtakai is a 2004 Maldivian romantic drama film directed by Ahmed Nimal. Produced by Ahmed Saleem under Artwaves, the film stars Ali Seezan, Niuma Mohamed, Ahmed Asim and Sheereen Abdul Wahid in pivotal roles.

Premise
Moonisa (Niuma Mohamed) and Shahid (Ali Seezan) lives a happy life with their daughter Nadhu until Shahid's childhood friend, Junaid (Ahmed Asim) returns from abroad who decides to take revenge on Moonisa for rebuffing his relationship proposal. Moonisa, who is pregnant to their second child visits her mother-in-law while Shahid stays due to his busy work schedule. Junaid's introduces Shahid to his friend Sabeeha (Sheereen Abdul Wahid) and convinces Shahid to hire her as his personal secretary in his factory. Their plan works successfully when Shahid decides to marry Sabeeha and she makes it her life mission to make Moonisa's life miserable.

Cast 
 Ali Seezan as Shahid
 Niuma Mohamed as Moonisa
 Ahmed Asim as Junaid
 Sheereen Abdul Wahid as Sabeeha
 Ali Shameel as Muneez
 Fauziyya Hassan as Raheema
 Neena Saleem as Athifa
 Mariyam Haleem as Hawwa
 Aishath Shaiha as Nadhu

Soundtrack

Accolades

References

2004 films
Maldivian romantic drama films
Films directed by Ahmed Nimal
2004 romantic drama films
Dhivehi-language films